Susan Li (born May 1, 1985) is a TV journalist who works for American television channel Fox Business Network.

Early life and education 
Li was born in China and grew up in Toronto, Canada. Her mentor was her mother, who raised a family on her own in Canada after emigrating from China. She graduated from the University of Toronto with a degree in economics. Fluent in English, she also speaks Cantonese and Mandarin.

Career

CBC 
Li began her career at the Canadian Broadcasting Corporation, where she contributed in various roles including associate producer and freelance reporter for both radio and television.

CCTV 
From 2003 until 2005, Li was an anchor at China Central Television’s CCTV International, the network’s English language channel. Broadcasting from Beijing, Li led the primetime world news broadcasts, hosted Biz China, the business news recap, and also was a news editor. While at CCTV she interviewed Venezuelan President Hugo Chávez, LVMH’s Bernard Arnault, and professional basketball player Yao Ming. She herself was interviewed about what it was like to be a repatriated Chinese person living in Beijing after growing up in Canada.

Bloomberg Television 
Li joined Bloomberg Television in 2006 as host of the channel's first primetime evening newscast in the Asia-Pacific region, Asia Business Tonight. She started hosting Bloomberg Edge and Morning Call in 2010. She hosted the First Up with Susan Li morning business show, where she focused on market openings across Asia, interviewed business leaders, and reported on top news stories from across the globe. Li also hosted Asia Stars, which had the distinction of largely being filmed onboard Hong Kong's famous Star Ferry as it crossed Victoria Harbour. She was also a co-host of Asia Edge, which featured more extensive interviews and news coverage.
 
As part of Bloomberg International's global programming, Li was seen around the world. During her time at the channel, she interviewed a wide range of business and government leaders, including Japanese Prime Minister Shinzo Abe, Malaysian Prime Minister Najib Razak, US Ambassador to China Gary Locke, Citi CEO Michael Corbat, Baidu CEO Robin Li, author Malcolm Gladwell, BlackRock Chairman and CEO Larry Finkand, and American casino developer Steve Wynn. She reported on and covered events such as the 2008 Summer Olympics in Beijing, the Shanghai World Expo, the Chinese stock market bubble, and the Global Financial Crisis. In 2008, she was nominated for the Best News Anchor award at the Asian Television Awards. In 2012 at the 17th Asian Television Awards, First Up won the Best News Programme Award, for which she as host was “Highly Commended” as Best Anchor.

CNBC Asia 
In 2014, Li joined CNBC Asia as co-anchor of Asia Squawk Box (ASB). She co-anchored ASB with Martin Soong in Singapore before that program moved to Hong Kong on 31 March 2014. Li and Bernard Lo co-anchored ASB from 31 March 2014 to 14 August 2015, ASB was solely based in Hong Kong during this time. Li also hosted First Class - CNBC International's luxury travel show. At the APEC Summit in Beijing in 2014, Li held the session on stage after Russian Prime Minister Vladimir Putin and before US President Barack Obama's address. Asia Squawk Box was named the Best News Program at the Asian Television Awards in 2015 with Li and Lo as hosts. In May 2014, she interviewed Indian Finance Minister P Chidambaram and Bank of Japan Governor Haruhiko Kuroda at the Asian Development Bank's annual meeting in Kazakhstan and Azerbaijan. Li has also covered the World Economic Forum in Davos Switzerland.

CNBC Europe 
On 10 September 2015, Li left CNBC Asia to join its London-based sister network CNBC Europe. She was a co-anchor of Worldwide Exchange along with Wilfred Frost (son of the late David Frost) and Carolin Roth through 31 December 2015. She last co-hosted the show from London and also on location throughout Asia and Europe.

CNBC 
Li joined CNBC in January 2016 as a correspondent and a relief presenter in New York. While at the channel, Li has interviewed Canadian Prime Minister Justin Trudeau, Robert de Niro, Nobu Matsuhisa, and Jet Li. She left CNBC in August 2017.

FOX Business 
Li joined Fox Business as a correspondent in April 2018. Since joining, Li has interviewed Apple Inc CEO Tim Cook, Canadian Prime Minister Justin Trudeau, Uber's CEO Dara Khosrowshahi, Airbnb's founder Brian Chesky, and Binance billionaire Changpeng Zhao during the FTX collapse. In mid-December 2022, during a round of Elon Musk's Twitter suspensions, Li's account was among those suspended.

Awards 
 Best Anchor, 17th Asian Television Awards (for "First Up with Susan Li")

References

External links

1985 births
Living people
Bloomberg L.P. people
Canadian television reporters and correspondents
Chinese expatriates in Canada
CBC Television people
CNBC people
Fox News people
University of Toronto alumni